Man and Boy may refer to:
Man and Boy (1971 film), American film
Man and Boy (2002 film), British television film
Man and Boy (novel) by Tony Parsons
Man and Boy (play) by Terence Rattigan
Man and Boy (sculpture), public sculpture by Elisabeth Hadley in Brixham, Devon, England
Man and Boy: Dada, opera by Michael Nyman and Michael Hastings